Ve stínu magie is a 1996 dungeon-crawler, grid-based, fantasy RPG video game developed by Czech company Division and published by JRC Interactive for the Amiga.

The Division team created a number of demos on the early 90s. Their next project, Ve stínu magie, was in developed for around half a year until its completion in 1996. The game was originally to be distributed by the company Signum, but the agreement but the agreement fell through, and the Czech market distribution was taken over by JRC company. The game sold poorly and was not very well received; there were also few Czech gamers who owned an Amiga at that time.

A sequel was released the following year.

References 

1996 video games
Amiga games
Amiga-only games
Dungeon crawler video games
Europe-exclusive video games
Fantasy video games
JRC Interactive games
Role-playing video games
Video games developed in the Czech Republic